Jermano Ashwin van Rabenswaay (born in Capelle aan den IJssel on May 16, 1998), known professionally as Maneaux, is a Dutch artist and music producer. Maneaux has collaborations with many artists which include: Murda, Yssi SB, OFB (rap group), Sevn Alias, Josylvio, Kempi, Delly Ranx, Anthony B, Re-Play and Tee Set.

Career
In 2020, Van Rabenswaay composed and produced the single Paper Zien (Remix) by Yssi SB.
which went #1 Trending in the Netherlands shortly after its release. This resulted in Maneaux receiving his first platinum certification, and the song would eventually win a FunX Music Award in the category of Best video later that year.

In 2021 Maneaux also featured as a judge on a Dutch TV show called RU Open Talent.

Discography

Singles

References 

Dutch record producers
1998 births
Living people